Qezeljeh (also known as Ghezelcheh and Qiziljeh) is a village in Kuhin Rural District, in the Central District of Kabudarahang County, Hamadan Province, Iran. At the 2006 census, its population was 293, in 68 families.

References 

Populated places in Kabudarahang County